Li Yu (given name: 仙侣 Xiānlǚ; courtesy name: 笠翁  Lìwēng; 1611–1680 AD), also known as Li Liweng, was a Chinese playwright, novelist and publisher.

Life and writings
Born in Rugao, in present-day Jiangsu province, he lived in the late Ming and early Qing dynasties. Although he passed the first stage of the imperial examination, he did not succeed in passing the higher levels before the political turmoil of the new dynasty, but instead turned to writing for the  market. Li was an actor, producer, and director as well as a playwright, who traveled with his own troupe. His play Fēngzhēng wù (風箏誤, "Errors caused by the Kite") remains a favorite of the Chinese Kun opera stage. His biographers call him a "writer-entrepreneur" and the “most versatile and enterprising writer of his time”.

Li is the presumed author of Ròu pútuán (肉蒲團, The Carnal Prayer Mat), a well-crafted comedy and a classic of Chinese erotic literature. He also wrote a book of short stories called Shí'èr lóu (十二樓, "Twelve Towers"). In his time he was widely read, and appreciated for his daringly innovative subject matter. He addresses the topic of same-sex love in the tale Cuìyǎ lóu (萃雅樓, "House of Gathered Refinements"). This is a theme which he revisits in the collection Wúshēng xì (無聲戲, "Silent Operas" i.e. "novels") and his play The Fragrant Companion. The painting manual Jieziyuan Huazhuan was prefaced and published by Li in Jinling.

Li was also known for his informal essays, or xiaopin, and for his gastronomy and gastronomical writings. Lin Yutang championed Li and translated a number of these essays. Li's whimsical, ironic "On Having a Stomach" proposes that the mouth and the stomach "cause all the worry and trouble of mankind throughout the ages." He continues that the "plants can live without a mouth and a stomach, and the rocks and the soil have their being without any nourishment. Why, then, must we be given a mouth and a stomach and endowed with these two extra organs?"  Lin also translated Li's  "How to be Happy Though Rich" and "How to be Happy Though Poor", and "The Arts of Sleeping, Walking, Sitting and Standing", which illustrate his satirical approach to serious topics.

Translations
 Patrick Hanan et al. (1990). "Silent Operas (Wusheng Xi)". Hong Kong: Research Centre for Translation, Chinese University of Hong Kong. 
 Patrick Hanan (1996). The Carnal Prayer Mat. Honolulu : University of Hawaii Press. .
 Patrick Hanan (1998). Tower for the Summer Heat. New York : Columbia University Press. .
 Nathan K Mao (1979). Twelve towers : short stories. Hong Kong: Chinese University Press. .
 Jacques Dars (2003). Au gré d'humeurs oisives : Les carnets secrets de Li Yu : un art du bonheur en Chine. Arles : Éditions Philippe Picquier. 
 Jou-pu-tuan : Andachtsmatten aus Fleisch ; e. erot. Roman aus d. Ming-Zeit. Frankfurt am Main : Fischer-Taschenbuch-Verlag. . 1986.
 LI‑YU Jeou-P'ou-T'ouan, la chair comme tapis de prière, translated by Pierre Klossowski; Éditions Jean-Jacques Pauvert, Paris, 1979
 Li Yu: À mari jaloux, femme fidèle, by Pascale Frey 1998

References

Sources and further reading
 Chen, Duo, "Li Yu". Encyclopedia of China, 1st ed.
 Chun-Shu Chang and Shelley Hsueh-Lun Chang. Crisis and Transformation in Seventeenth-Century China: Society, Culture, and Modernity in Li Yü's World. Ann Arbor: University of Michigan Press,  1992.   x, 452p. .
 Owen, Stephen, "Li, Yu, Silent Operas (Wu-sheng xi)," in Stephen Owen, ed. An Anthology of Chinese Literature: Beginnings to 1911. New York: W. W. Norton, 1997. p. 915-941. (. (Archive).
 Patrick Hanan (1988). The Invention of Li Yu. Cambridge, Mass. : Harvard University Press. . Comprehensive overview of Li Yu's life and works, containing many substantial excerpts from Li Yu's essays, plays, short stories and novel.
 Andrea Stocken: Das Ästhetikkonzept des Li Yu (1610–1680) im Xianqing ouji im Zusammenhang von Leben und Werk. 2005 
 HENRY, Eric: Chinese Amusement - The Lively Plays of Li Yü.Archon Books Hamden, CT 1980
 Воскресенский Д.Н. Ли Юй. Полуночник Вэйян или подстилка из плоти. (пер. с кит., предисл., коммент.) М., Гудьял-Пресс
Воскресенский Д.Н. Ли Юй. Двенадцать башен (повести XVII в.). (пер. с кит., предисл., коммент.) М., Гудьял-Пресс

External links

 WorldCat Identity Page Yi Li
 Brief review of The Carnal Prayer Mat

1610 births
1680 deaths
Chinese erotica writers
Ming dynasty novelists
Qing dynasty novelists
Writers from Nantong
Chinese male novelists
Qing dynasty dramatists and playwrights
Chinese male short story writers
Ming dynasty short story writers
Qing dynasty short story writers
Short story writers from Jiangsu
People from Rugao
17th-century Chinese dramatists and playwrights
17th-century Chinese novelists
17th-century theatre managers